Proto-Malayo-Polynesian (PMP) is the reconstructed ancestor of the Malayo-Polynesian languages, which is by far the largest branch (by current speakers) of the Austronesian language family. Proto-Malayo-Polynesian is ancestral to all Austronesian languages spoken outside Taiwan, as well as the Yami language on Taiwan's Orchid Island. The first systematic reconstruction of Proto-Austronesian ("Uraustronesisch") by Otto Dempwolff was based on evidence from languages outside of Taiwan, and was therefore actually the first reconstruction of what is now known as Proto-Malayo-Polynesian.

Phonology

Consonants
The following consonants can be reconstructed for Proto-Malayo-Polynesian (Blust 2009):

The phonetic value of the reconstructed sounds *p, *b, *w, *m, *t, *d, *n, *s, *l, *r, *k, *g, *ŋ, *q, *h was as indicated by the spelling. The symbols *ñ, *y, *z, *D, *j, *R are orthographic conventions first introduced by Dyen (1947). The assumed phonetic values are given in the table.

This consonant system is quite similar to the ancestral Proto-Austronesian (PAN) system, but is characterized by three mergers:

 PAN *t/*C > PMP *t
 PAN *l/*N > PMP *l
 PAN *h/*S > PMP *h

Vowels
The Proto-Austronesian vowels *a, *i, *u, *e (/ə/) and final diphthongs *ay, *aw, *uy, *iw remained unchanged.

Alternative views
In a recent study, Roger Blench (2016) has raised doubts that there was actually a single unitary Proto-Malayo-Polynesian language. Rather, Malayo-Polynesian expansion across the Luzon Strait consisted of multi-ethnic crews rapidly settling across various locations in maritime Southeast Asia, as suggested by both archaeological and linguistic evidence. There was also a Malayo-Polynesian migration to Hainan; Blench (2016) notes that both Hlai and Austronesian peoples use the foot-braced backstrap loom as well.

Lexicon
Below are selected animal and plant names in Proto-Malayo-Polynesian from the Austronesian Comparative Dictionary.

Animal names

Plant names

See also
 Proto-Austronesian language
 Proto-Philippine language
 Proto-Oceanic language
 Proto-Polynesian language

Notes

References

Further reading 

  Accessed: 27 Dec. 2022.
  Accessed 26 Dec. 2022.
  Accessed 26 Dec. 2022.
 
  Accessed 27 Dec. 2022.
 
 Reid, Lawrence. "The Reconstruction of a Dual Pronoun to Proto Malayo-Polynesian". In: Discovering History Through Language. Papers in Honour of Malcolm Ross. edited by Bethwyn Evans. Canberra: Pacific Linguistics, 2009. pp. 461-477.

External links
 ABVD: Proto-Malayo-Polynesian
 A Comparison of Austronesian Languages-WebCite query result

Austronesian languages
Malayo-Polynesian